Karola is a Danish, Finnish, German, Hungarian, Norwegian,  and Swedish feminine given name that is a feminine form of Karol and Carolus and an alternate form of Carola. Notable people with the name include the following:

Given name 

Karola Bloch (1905 — 1994), Polish architect, socialist, and feminist
Karola Ebeling (born 1935), German actress
Karola Maier Milobar (1876 – ??), Croatian physician 
Karola Neher, birthname of Carola Neher (1900 – 1942), German actress and singer
Karola Obermueller (born 1977), German composer and teacher
Karola Schustereder (born 1966), Austrian rower
 Karola Siegel, birthname of Ruth Westheimer (born 1928; known as "Dr. Ruth"), German-American sex therapist, talk show host, author, professor, Holocaust survivor, and former Haganah sniper.
Karola Stotz (1963 – 2019), German scholar
Karola Sube (born 1964), German gymnast 
Karola Szulc, birthname of Caroline Schultze (1866 – ???), Polish physician
Karola Zala (1879 – 1970), Hungarian actress

Middle name
Princess Margarete Karola of Saxony (1900 – 1962), German royal
Feodora Karola Charlotte Marie Adelheid Auguste Mathilde full name of Princess Feodora of Saxe-Meiningen (1890 – 1972), German royal

See also

Carola
Karla (name)
Karol (name)
Karole
Karolj
Károly
Karoli (disambiguation)
Karula (disambiguation)

Notes

 Danish feminine given names
 Finnish feminine given names
 German feminine given names
 Hungarian feminine given names
 Norwegian feminine given names
 Swedish feminine given names